Kidnapping is the taking away of a person against the person's will.

Kidnapping may also refer to:

 The Kidnapping, or Black Friday, a 2007 film by Arthur Allan Seidelman
 The Austere Academy: or, Kidnapping!, an unreleased special edition in the book series A Series of Unfortunate Events

See also

 Abduction (disambiguation)
 Kidnap (disambiguation)
 Kidnapped (disambiguation)
 Kidnapper (disambiguation)
 List of kidnappings